When The Ship Goes Down is the second official extended play by the Australian indie band, the Holidays. It was released on 11 October 2008, less than 6 months after the release of their debut, The Holidays EP. Recorded with Wayne Connolly producing, When the Ship Goes Down is a concept EP, "about the decline of relationships and the thrill when one catches you by surprise".

As explained by Alex Kortt, "the reason for doing the two EPs was to do with giving people a good snapshot of where we're at musically. Not only that, but to really make sure that before we do an album we know exactly the direction we want to take. I mean as far as where we were at mentally we probably just weren't at the stage where we wanted to do an album just yet."

The lead single off this EP, "Mexico", had a music video made for it. It received regular airplay on national youth radio station Triple J.

Track listing 

"When The Ship Goes Down"
"Mexico"
"Take Your Own Advice"
"All The Girls"
"The Comeback"

References

External links 

 Official Website

2008 EPs
The Holidays albums